Vasilije Adžić (born 12 May 2006) is a Montenegrin professional footballer who plays as a midfielder for Budućnost Podgorica.

Club career
Adžić signed a scholarship contract with Budućnost Podgorica in April 2022. He made his debut in August of the same year, scoring a long-range chip against Arsenal Tivat in a 4–0 win. In doing so, he became the youngest goal-scorer in Budućnost Podgorica history, and the second youngest in Montenegrin top-flight football, behind Ilija Vukotić.

International career
Adžić has represented Montenegro at numerous youth international levels.

Career statistics
.

References

2006 births
Living people
Footballers from Nikšić
Montenegrin footballers
Montenegro youth international footballers
Association football midfielders
Montenegrin First League players
FK Budućnost Podgorica players